Chile competed at the 1976 Winter Olympics in Innsbruck, Austria after they missed in 1972.

Alpine skiing

Men

References
Official Olympic Reports
 Olympic Winter Games 1976, full results by sports-reference.com

Nations at the 1976 Winter Olympics
1976
1976 in Chilean sport